Gregory Gerald Antonacci (February 2, 1947 – September 20, 2017) was an American television actor, director, producer, and writer. He portrayed Johnny Torrio in Boardwalk Empire in every season, from 2010 to 2014, and as Phil Leotardo's right-hand man Butch DeConcini in The Sopranos from 2006 to the series finale in 2007.

Early life and career
Antonacci was born in Hell's Kitchen, Manhattan. As a director, producer, and writer, he worked on a number of television series, including Busting Loose, Brothers, The Tortellis, Perfect Strangers, The Royal Family, The John Larroquette Show, Herman's Head, It's a Living, Soap, and other series.

As an actor, he had roles in The Rockford Files, as Vinnie Morabito on Busting Loose, Tony Manucci on Makin' It, Butch DeConcini on The Sopranos, and Johnny Torrio on Boardwalk Empire. In 1976, he played the role of Hector in "A Nun's Story" and "Good Time Girls" during season two of Laverne & Shirley. He made a cameo appearance as a mobster in the 2013 film The Family.

Antonacci was also a playwright, theatrical actor, and director, participating in multiple productions and roles at the La MaMa Experimental Theater Club in the East Village  throughout the early through mid-1970s. He wrote and performed in the 1971 Off-Off-Broadway musical "Dance Wi' Me (or, The Fatal Twitch)," which was directed by Joel Zwick and produced at La MaMa. This play was produced again at La MaMa in 1974, and then renamed and re-staged as the Broadway musical "Dance With Me," opening January 23, 1975 at the Mayfair Theatre in New York City.

Personal life and death
In 1978, Antonacci married actress Annie Potts. They divorced in 1980. In 1981, he married actress Lynda Costanzo. They had one child. He died at the age of 70 in Massapequa, New York, on September 20, 2017. His death occurred exactly one week after that of Frank Vincent, who played Phil Leotardo, Butch DeConcini's boss, on The Sopranos.

Filmography

References

External links

Greg Antonacci's page on La MaMa Archives Digital Collections

1947 births
American writers of Italian descent
20th-century American male actors
21st-century American male actors
Male actors from New York City
20th-century American dramatists and playwrights
American male television actors
American television directors
Television producers from New York City
American television writers
American male television writers
People from Hell's Kitchen, Manhattan
American male dramatists and playwrights
2017 deaths
20th-century American male writers
Film directors from New York City
Screenwriters from New York (state)
American people of Italian descent